XQ Institute is an Oakland, California-based nonprofit organization that develops programs to improve high school education in the United States. The institute began with XQ: The Super School Project, to identify new ideas to reform schools and improve student performance.

The organization was founded in September 2015 by Laurene Powell Jobs and Russlynn Ali. XQ Institute's Board includes Marc Ecko, Yo-Yo Ma, Geoffrey Canada, Jimmy Iovine, and Michael Klein.

History
XQ Institute was founded in September 2015 by Laurene Powell Jobs and Russlynn Ali, former assistant secretary of civil rights at the U.S. Department of Education. The institute was funded by Emerson Collective, an advocacy organization created by Jobs to fund philanthropic projects. XQ Institute was founded with the goal of changing the high school model, seen as being obsolete. The launch coincided with the announcement of a $50 million competition to redesign American public high schools, with funds to be awarded to build five new schools.

In May 2016, the program launched a traveling yellow school bus with an interactive display that allowed students to share suggestions for improving high schools. In September, ten schools were selected to receive $10 million each, out of 700 applicants.

In September 2017, XQ Institute launched EIF Presents: XQ Super School Live, a one-hour telecast on ABC, CBS, NBC, and Fox. The show featured Ringo Starr, Tom Hanks, Common, Samuel L. Jackson, Justin Timberlake, and Jennifer Hudson.

In October 2019, XQ Institute partnered with New York City charitable organization Robin Hood Foundation to donate $16 million to help open new and restructured public schools in the city. The NY Times reported at the time that XQ: The Super School Project, XQ had given out more than $100 million in grants to help teams of students and educators implement ideas for new high schools.

In March 2020, Rhode Island Governor Gina Raimondo and state Education Commissioner Angélica Infante-Green announced at the State House that two schools, Trinity Academy for the Performing Arts and Ponaganset High School, were each getting $500,000 grants from XQ to find ways to improve modern high schools. In May, XQ partnered with Los Angeles-based Entertainment Industry Foundation to host "Graduate Together", a virtual graduation for 2020 high school graduates, hosted by NBA star LeBron James, and featuring video appearances from celebrities including Barack Obama, Jonas Brothers and Pharrell Williams. The program received a 2020 Peabody Award nomination in the Public Service category.

Programs
XQ Institute's XQ:The Super School Project hosts a contest for new education ideas, and selects winners of funding awards. Representatives from schools that are selected become part of XQ's “community of practice,” designed for schools to exchange successful ideas with education researchers. As of 2018, almost 700 schools across the United States had applied for XQ grants.

The institution also hosts the XQ Yearbook, a digital yearbook fort high school students, teachers and others to share their ideas and experiences, with submissions tied to XQ's funding for mental health. The organization also hosted a national contest along with civic engagement group For Freedoms for students to design visual art illustrating their vision for high school for the next generation.

Organization
XQ Institute is headquartered in Oakland, California. It is funded by the Emerson Collective, and its CEO is Russlynn Ali.

References

External links
XQ Institute's website

Non-profit organizations based in California
Education in the United States
United States educational programs